Ceratophya is a genus of hoverflies, with five known species. They are distinct from Microdon by the presence of an appendix on vein R4+5. Many species have erroneously been placed in this genus. Some authors place Ceratophya as a subgenus of Microdon.

Biology
Larvae are found in ant nests.

Distribution
Distribution is Neotropical.

Species
There are five known species as of 2013:
C. argentinensis Reemer, 2013
C. carinifacies (Curran, 1934)
C. notata Wiedemann, 1824
C. panamensis (Curran, 1930)
C. scolopus (Shannon, 1927)

References

Hoverfly genera
Diptera of North America
Microdontinae
Taxa named by Christian Rudolph Wilhelm Wiedemann